Hwagok-dong is a dong, neighbourhood of Gangseo-gu in Seoul, South Korea.

Attractions
 88 Gymnasium - Lee Min Woo of Shinhwa held his first solo concert entitled "M's Girl Friend", on 14 and 15 January 2006.

See also 
Administrative divisions of South Korea

References

External links
Gangseo-gu official website
 Gangseo-gu map at the Gangseo-gu official website
 Resident offices of Gangseo-gu

Neighbourhoods of Gangseo District, Seoul